Thomas Hafstad (born 13 March 1974) is a retired Norwegian football player.

Hafstad was a right full back, but he also played in midfield. Hafstad played for Beisfjord, Narvik/Nor and Mjølner before he joined Tromsø IL in 1994.

Honours
Norwegian cup champion 1996

External links
Thomas Hafstad profile at til.no

References

1974 births
Living people
Norwegian footballers
Norway youth international footballers
Norway under-21 international footballers
Eliteserien players
Tromsø IL players
People from Narvik
FK Mjølner players
Association football defenders
Sportspeople from Nordland